Aggi Veerudu ( Fire Martial) is a 1969 Telugu-language swashbuckler film, produced by B. Vittalacharya under the Sri Vital Combines banner and directed by B. V. Srinivas. It stars N. T. Rama Rao and Rajasree, with music composed by  Vijaya Krishna Murthy.

Plot
The film begins, with the alliance of Prince Yesovardhana (N. T. Rama Rao) with Princess Padmavathi (Rajasri). But Rudhirakshudu (Tyagaraju), a wizard wants to marry Padmavathi. So, he kidnaps her, transforms her parents into fish, and orders one demon to create unrest in the bridegroom's house. Yesovardhana's father loses his eyesight due to the demon. Now, Yesovardhana takes a pledge to get back his father's eyesight and protect Padmavathi. So, he starts an adventurous tour. On the way, special and peculiar incidents happen; Yesovardhana relieves many people from their curses and he is awarded Aggi Veerudu. Meanwhile, Padmavathi escapes from the wizard, but due to the curse of a Saint, she is transformed into a rat. The rest of the story is about how Yesovardhana protects Padmavathi, gets back his father's eyesight, returns his in-laws to their original form, and eliminates Rudhirakshudu. Finally, the movie ends with the marriage of Yesovardhana and Padmavathi.

Cast
N. T. Rama Rao as Yeshovardhana
Rajasree as Padmavathi
Satyanarayana
Ramakrishna as Sesanka Varma
Mikkilineni
Mukkamala as Dharma Teja
Tyagaraju as Rudhirakshudu
Madhukuri Satyam
Raavi Kondala Rao
Vijayalalitha as Kamandhaki
Meena Kumari as Hamsa
Sarathi as Fisherman

Soundtrack

Music composed by  Vijaya Krishna Murthy.

References

Indian fantasy adventure films
Films based on Indian folklore
1960s Telugu-language films
1960s fantasy adventure films
Indian swashbuckler films